HD 98617, also known HR 4385, is a double star located in the southern circumpolar constellation Chamaeleon. The system has a combined apparent magnitude of 6.35, placing it near the limit for naked eye. At its current distance, HD 98617 brightness is diminished by 0.29 magnitudes due to interstellar dust.

The system's nature as a double star was first observed in a 1991 Hipparcos multiplicity survey. Unfortunately, their current separation is six-tenths of an arcsecond, making it difficult to measure the properties of the individual components. Nevertheless, the 10th magnitude companion is located along a position angle of 237° as of 2018.

The primary has a stellar classification of A8 IIIm:, indicating that it is an evolved Am star (with uncertainty). However, Renson and Manfroid (2009) lists its chemical peculiarity to be doubtful. It has 1.75 times the mass of the Sun and 1.85 times its girth. It is estimated to be a billion years old and has a solar metallicity. Ironically, the aforementioned parameters belong to an A-type main-sequence star instead of a giant star and Gaia DR3 even models it as such.

References

Double stars
098617
055225
4385
Chamaeleon (constellation)
Am stars
CD-78 00457
Chamaeleontis, 30
A-type giants